Isabel Mattuzzi (born 23 April 1995) is an Italian 3000 metres steeplechaseer, who won one national championship and who concluded at 35th place in the 2018 outdoor seasonal world lists of the 3000 metres steeplechase.

Career
Mattuzzi retired at the young age of 26, one step away from qualifying for the Tokyo 2021 Olympics, to devote herself full-time to his true passion: studying and thus obtaining a master's degree.

Personal Best
3000 metres steeplechase: 9:34.02 -  Berlin, 10 August 2018

Achievements

National titles
 Italian Athletics Championships
 3000 m steeplechase: 2018, 2019
 10,000 m: 2019

See also
 Italian all-time lists - 3000 m steeplechase

References

External links

1995 births
Living people
People from Rovereto
Italian female steeplechase runners
Italian female long-distance runners
Italian Athletics Championships winners
Sportspeople from Trentino